Yunita Tetty (born 10 December 1981) is an Indonesian former badminton player affiliated with Suryanaga Surabaya club. She was the mixed doubles silver medalists at the 2005 Southeast Asian Games.

Achievements

Southeast Asian Games 
Mixed doubles

IBF World Grand Prix 
The World Badminton Grand Prix was sanctioned by the International Badminton Federation from 1983 to 2006.

Mixed doubles

BWF International Challenge/Series 
Women's doubles

Mixed doubles

  BWF International Challenge tournament
  BWF International Series/Satellite tournament

References

External links 
 

Living people
1981 births
Indonesian female badminton players
Competitors at the 2005 Southeast Asian Games
Southeast Asian Games silver medalists for Indonesia
Southeast Asian Games bronze medalists for Indonesia
Southeast Asian Games medalists in badminton
20th-century Indonesian women
21st-century Indonesian women